TNA: There's No Place Like Home was a scheduled professional wrestling pay-per-view event produced by Impact Wrestling. It was planned to take place during the WrestleCon convention on April 3, 2020 at The Ritz Ybor in Tampa, Florida and stream live on FITE TV. The event was cancelled in response to the COVID-19 pandemic.

Event concept
The concept of this event is a throwback show to Impact Wrestling's previous years as NWA: Total Nonstop Action (NWA-TNA), from 2002 to 2004, and Total Nonstop Action Wrestling (TNA), from 2004 to 2017. The event's logo is based on the promotion's original NWA-TNA logo.

D'Lo Brown and Mr. Anderson were scheduled to represent The Aces and 8's at this event. Chris Harris and eight time X Division champion Chris Sabin were both scheduled to make an appearance. TNA legend Shark Boy also featured on the promotional material for this event.

Announced matches at the time of cancellation

References

External links
impactwrestling.com

2020 Impact Wrestling pay-per-view events
Professional wrestling shows in Tampa, Florida
2020 in professional wrestling in Florida
April 2020 events in the United States
Sports events cancelled due to the COVID-19 pandemic
2020s in Tampa, Florida